Chak 284 GB [Din Pur |Urdu:دین پور] is a village of Toba Tek Singh District, Punjab, Pakistan, near Rajana. It is a part of Union Council Number 2, along with closest villages, Chak No. 286 GB, Chak No. 285 GB & Chak No. 291 GB.

References 
 

Union councils of Toba Tek Singh District
Populated places in Toba Tek Singh District
Toba Tek Singh District